Bucculatrix arnicella is a species of moth in the family Bucculatricidae. The species was first described in 1925 by Annette Frances Braun. It is found in North America, where it has been recorded from Utah, Montana, Alberta and Wyoming. The habitat consists of open lodgepole pine and Douglas fir forests.

The wingspan is about 8 mm. The forewings are densely speckled with black-tipped and black scales. Areas with more narrowly dark-tipped scales may appear as pale patches and streaks. The hindwings are grey. Adults have been recorded on wing May and from June to August.

The larvae feed on Arnica cordifolia. They mine the leaves of their host plant. The mine is linear and has a somewhat winding course on the leaf blade, but later follows the leaf margin. Larvae leave this mine and mine into the leaf from the underside making a number of successively larger, but small Coleophora-like mines. A single leaf may contain more than ten such mines. Young larvae are green, while older larvae are reddish with darker red longitudinal stripes. Pupation takes place in whitish to yellowish or pink cocoons.

References

Natural History Museum Lepidoptera generic names catalog

Bucculatricidae
Moths described in 1925
Moths of North America
Taxa named by Annette Frances Braun